Stoughton Public School District or Stoughton Public Schools is a school district headquartered in Stoughton, Massachusetts.

Schools
Secondary:
 Stoughton High School
 Dr. Robert G. O'Donnell Middle School

Primary:
 Dawe
 Gibbons
 Hansen
 South
 Wilkins

Preschools:
 Jones Early Childhood Center

References

External links
 Stoughton Public Schools
School districts in Massachusetts
Education in Norfolk County, Massachusetts